The Montpellier Laboratory of Computer Science, Robotics, and Microelectronics (Laboratoire d'Informatique, de Robotique et de Microélectronique de Montpellier, LIRMM) is a cross-faculty research entity of the University of Montpellier and the National Center for Scientific Research (CNRS).

The spectrum of research activities covered by the LIRMM ranges from circuit design, to modeling of complex agent-based systems, algorithmic studies, bio-computing, human-computer interfaces, and robotics. These activities are conducted mainly within the three scientific research departments:
 Computer Science (INFO)
 Microelectronics (MIC)
 Robotics (ROB)

There is also inter-departmental research conducted in the subjects of Water-Sea-Ocean, Logic, Security and safety, and AI and Data Science.

Department of Robotics
The Robotics department deals with problems of synthesis, supervision and management of complex dynamic systems (robots, robot / live interface), and also navigation, location and piloting of autonomous vehicles present or remote, or Others for analysis, coding and image processing. One of the particularities of the LIRMM is that theory, tools, experiments and applications are present in all its fields of scientific competence.
This department has gained immense reputation in academic and industrial fraternity because of its strong industrial tie ups and groundbreaking products delivered over the years. Some famous robots that rolled out of this department are BRIGIT™ (Medtech (robotic surgery)) and Quattro (Adept Technology).

The Department of Robotics consists of four teams:
 DEXTER : Robotique médicale et mécanismes parallèles
 EXPLORE : Robotique mobile pour l’exploration de l’environnement
 ICAR : Image & Interaction
 IDH : Interactive Digital Humans

Department of Microelectronics
The Microelectronics Department conducts cutting-edge research in the areas of design and testing of integrated systems and microsystems, with an emphasis on architectural, modeling and methodological aspects.

LIRMM’s Microelectronics Department is organized in three teams:
 ADAC : ADAptive Computing
 SmartIES : Smart Integrated Electronic Systems
 TEST : Test and dEpendability of microelectronic integrated SysTems

Department of Informatics
The themes of the Computer  Science department range from the boundaries of mathematics to applied research: graphical algorithms, bioinformatics, cryptography, networks, databases and information systems (data integration, data mining, maintaining coherence) (Programming languages, objects, components, models), artificial intelligence (learning, constraints, knowledge representation, multi-agent systems), human-machine interaction (natural language, visualization, semantic web and e-learning).

The Computer Science Department is organized into the following 15 teams:
 ADVANSE : ADVanced Analytics for data SciencE
 ALGCO : Algorithmes, Graphes et Combinatoire
 BOREAL : Représentation de Connaissances et Langages à Base de Règles pour Raisonner sur les Données
 COCONUT : Agents, Apprentissage, Contraintes
 DALI : Digits, architectures et logiciels informatiques
 ECO : Exact Computing
 ESCAPE : Systèmes complexes, automates et pavages
 ICAR : Image & Interaction
 MAB : Méthodes et algorithmes pour la bio informatique
 MAORE : Methods, Algorithms for Operations REsearch
 MAREL : Models and Reuse Engineering, Languages
 SMILE : Système Multi-agent, Interaction, Langage, Evolution
 TEXTE : Exploration et exploitation de données textuelles
 WEB3 : Web Architecture X Semantic Web X Web of Data
 ZENITH : Gestion de données scientifiques

Notable people
1. François Pierrot

2. Abderrahmane Kheddar

External links
 LIRMM Official website in French
 LIRMM Official website in English

University of Montpellier